Football is Cyprus's most popular sport.

Short of some sporadic surprise wins versus higher-ranked countries, mostly on home soil, the national team has not enjoyed any success of note. On the other hand, Cypriot clubs have reached the Champions League Group Stage three times in recent years; that has made Cyprus the smallest sovereign state (in both terms of area and population) to have been represented in the main phase of Europe's most prestigious club tournament, since the introduction of the group stage in 1992. APOEL FC made history by being the first Cypriot team to reach the quarter finals of UEFA Champions League in 2012, and by reaching the last 16 of the UEFA Europa League in 2017. 
The recent successes of APOEL FC team, both in the domestic championship and in Europe, have made it the most successful club in Cyprus.However, AC Omonia is still the most popular club in Cyprus.

Moreover, the national association has organised various FIFA and UEFA events (tournaments, courses, meetings).

History
Football was introduced to Cyprus early in the 20th century by the British (Canon Frank Darvall Newham, founder of The English School, Nicosia). Initially played in the island's schools, it proved hugely popular and a number of clubs were duly formed. Football clubs played friendly games only and the first unofficial island-wide league was organised on 1932.

The rivalry between teams that support different political parties has grown intense over the decades and the matches result in bloody conflicts between the fans. The fans take extreme pride in their team not only because the history of their team but because the connection their political party has with their team. The more hardcore right wing fans were waved before fascist symbols during matches whereas the hardcore left wing fans wave symbols associated with communism. AC Omonia's hardcore fans in the season 2011-2012 made an enormous choreography of the hammer and sickle, whereas Anorthosis Famagusta FC and others have shown their love towards their turkish-occupied home city of Famagusta and their passionate Greek-Cypriot heritage. The two teams mentioned above have an often violent rivalry, resulting in injuries to fans.

Cyprus Football Association

As football became established, the clubs were united in agreeing that an official body was needed to regulate the sport. In September 1934, the Cyprus Football Association (CFA) was formed and matches were soon being played on an official basis. The association became a FIFA member in 1948 and an UEFA member in 1962.

Pancyprian Footballers Association
Until the mid-1980s, footballers in Cyprus did not have any organisation or union that promoted their interests. Players were usually paid small wages and needed to have other jobs in order to support themselves and their families. On December 12, 1987 the Pancyprian Footballers Association was created. On February 25, 1997, the PFA became a FIFPro member.

There are 52,403 (19,203 registered) players and 108 football clubs in Cyprus.

League system

The governing body of football in Cyprus is the Cyprus Football Association. The first official league was organised in 1934. The Cyprus Football Association oversees the organization of:

 Leagues:
 Cypriot First Division
 Cypriot Second Division
 Cypriot Third Division
 STOK Elite Division
 Cup tournaments:
 Cypriot Cup
 Cypriot Super Cup
 Cypriot Cup for lower divisions
 National teams:
 Cyprus national football team
 Cyprus national under-21 football team

Teams

National team

The Cypriot national team has yet to qualify for any major FIFA or UEFA competition, but it has been improving in recent qualifying tournaments.

Cyprus' highest FIFA ranking (43rd) came in October 2010. Cyprus is currently ranked 87th (June 2015 list).

See also
 Cypriot football clubs in European competitions

References